The 1999–2000 Football League Cup (known as the Worthington Cup for sponsorship reasons) was the 40th staging of the Football League Cup, a knockout competition for England's top 92 football clubs.

The competition began on 10 August 1999, and ended with the final on 27 February 2000, the last final to be held at the old Wembley Stadium. For the first time in English football history, the entire draw for each round was made after the First Round. This meant each team could plot their route to the final as well as predicting future opponents.

The tournament was won by Leicester City, who beat Tranmere Rovers 2–1 in the final, thanks to two goals from Matt Elliott, sandwiched by an equaliser from David Kelly.

First round
The 70 First, Second and Third Division clubs (with the exception of Blackburn Rovers and Charlton Athletic, who were relegated from the Premiership last season) compete from the First Round. Each section is divided equally into a pot of seeded clubs and a pot of unseeded clubs. Clubs' rankings depend upon their finishing position in the 1998–99 season.

1 Team at home in the 1st leg is denoted as the home team

Second round
The 35 winners from the First Round joined the 13 Premier League clubs not participating in European competition, along with Blackburn Rovers And Charlton Athletic in Round Two. First leg matches were played on 14 and 15 September, second leg matches were played on 21 and 22 September.

1 Team at home in the 1st leg is denoted as the home team

Third round
The 25 winners from the Second Round joined the seven Premiership clubs participating in European competition in Round Three. Matches were played on 12 and 13 October.

Fourth round
Most matches were played on 30 November 1 December with one played on 15 December.

Quarter-finals
The four matches were played between 14 December and 12 January.

NOTE: This match was a replay after West Ham were order to replay the match after fielding an ineligible player in the original tie. West Ham had won the original tie on penalties.

Semi-finals
The semi-final draw was made in December 1999 after the conclusion of the quarter finals. Unlike the other rounds, the semi-final ties were played over two legs, with each team playing one leg at home. The first leg matches were played on 12 and 25 January 2000, the second leg matches were played on 26 January and 2 February 2000. Tranmere Rovers reached the first major cup final of their history with a fine win over Bolton Wanderers, while Leicester City's victory over Aston Villa gave them their third appearance in the competition's final in four years.

First leg

Second leg

Tranmere Rovers won 4–0 on aggregate

Leicester City won 1–0 on aggregate

Final

The 2000 Worthington Cup Final was played on 27 February 2000 and was contested between Leicester City and Tranmere Rovers at Wembley Stadium. Leicester won the game 2–1.

References

External links
 Official Carling Cup website
 Carling Cup at bbc.co.uk
 League Cup news, match reports and pictures on Reuters.co.uk
 Results on Soccerbase

1999–2000
Cup